Głuchów  is a village in the administrative district of Gmina Grójec, within Grójec County, Masovian Voivodeship, in east-central Poland.

Notable residents
Jan Czekanowski (1882–1965), anthropologist, statistician, ethnographer, traveller, and linguist

References

Villages in Grójec County